Guánica is a town and municipality in southwestern Puerto Rico, bordering the Caribbean Sea, south of Sabana Grande, east of Lajas, and west of Yauco. It is part of the Yauco metropolitan statistical area.

The town of Guánica, also known as Pueblo de Guánica, is the principal town of the municipality. The town is located on a deeply indented harbor of the same name.

Guánica's postal ZIP Code is 00653 and telephone area codes are 787 and 939. The urban settlement of Ensenada has a separate postal ZIP Code of 00647.

History

Settlement
Juan Ponce de Leon landed in the Guánica harbor on August 12, 1508, and founded a town called Guaynía, a word derived from the Taíno language that is popularly said to mean "Here is a place with water". The town, considered the first capital of the island of Puerto Rico (which was at that time named Isla de San Juan Bautista), was destroyed during the indigenous uprising of 1511, and the area was abandoned by Europeans for some years, during which time San Juan (itself at first called Puerto Rico) became the capital of the island.

Puerto Rico was ceded by Spain in the aftermath of the Spanish–American War under the terms of the Treaty of Paris of 1898 and became a territory of the United States. In 1899, the United States Department of War conducted a census of Puerto Rico finding that the population of Guánica was 2,700. The re-founded town of Guánica was at first a barrio of the municipality of Yauco until Guánica was established as a separate municipality on March 13, 1914. Víctor Ángel Sallaberry Safini was Guánica's first mayor.

Invasion

On July 25, 1898, American forces (who included the young poet-writer Carl Sandburg led by General Nelson A. Miles) landed in Guánica as part of the course of the Puerto Rican Campaign in the Spanish–American War. This invasion led to Puerto Rico being acquired by the United States. The invasion, just one small part of the war between Spain and United States, occurred in Guánica due to its sheltered harbor and proximity to Ponce, besides being such an unexpected site for such an attack, which had been anticipated at the heavily fortified city of San Juan. The Gloucester was the first ship to set anchor in the Bay of Guánica. Twenty-eight sailors and Marines, under the command of lieutenants H. P. Huse and Wood, departed from the ship on rafts and landed on the beach. The Marines lowered the Spanish flag from the beach flagpole and replaced it with the American flag. They then proceeded to set up a machine gun nest and placed barbed wire around their perimeter. The first land skirmish in Puerto Rico between the Puerto Rican militia and the American forces occurred when Lt. Méndez López and his men attacked and opened fire on the Americans. During the small battle which followed, the Americans returned fire with their machine gun and the Gloucester began to bombard the Spanish position. Lt. Méndez López and three of his men were wounded and the militia unit was forced to retreat to the town of Yauco. The invasion is commemorated by a contentious monument on the waterfront: along a broad paseo (el malecón), there is a large coral boulder known as the Guánica Rock (Piedra de Guánica) marked by the carved words, "3rd Battalion, 1st U.S.V. Engineers, September 16, 1898." July 25 was subsequently commemorated in Puerto Rico as Occupation Day, later renamed Constitution Day (see Public holidays in Puerto Rico).

Today

Guánica is a modern town that maintains roots and connections to a traditional past. Known as el pueblo de la amistad ('the town of friendship'), it is also occasionally referred to as el pueblo de las doce calles ('the town of the twelve streets'). The central part of town consists of five streets running north–south crossing seven other streets that run east–west, resulting in a compact grid of 24 square blocks, one of which is the main town square. Facing the square are the Catholic church, city hall, a school, and many shops; the plaza itself contains greenery, walks, and a music stand. In recent years this central area of the twelve streets has been extensively supplemented by suburbs in the south and west. Hills surround the town and harbor, including the  hill to the east of town, itself topped by the tiny Fort Caprón. Two large factories, one producing fertilizer, partially distract the eye from the pleasant landscape, but both have been important to the economy of the town, at one time dominated by the sugar plantations of Central Guánica. The resort chain known as Club Med once attempted to set up a luxury resort on beaches east of the town but withdrew due to local opposition which was apprehensive about both environmental and community degradation. It is a fishing village; commercial fishermen still ply their traditional trade beyond the harbor entrance. Copamarina Beach Resort & Spa offers beach access and a short boat ride to Gilligan Island, the westernmost key of the Cayos de Caña Gorda, which is a great spot to go snorkeling. The water is crystal clear and shallow, in which old pieces of coral and fish can be seen. People can walk or swim from one island to another.

On September 20, 2017, Hurricane Maria struck the island of Puerto Rico.  In Guánica, 951 homes were damaged or destroyed.

On January 6, 2020, a 5.8 magnitude earthquake was felt in Guánica and nearby municipalities, and several residences and cars were destroyed. On January 7, 2020, a 6.4 magnitude earthquake hit.

Geography

Guánica has mountains and a dry forest. The Guánica State Forest (Bosque Estatal de Guánica) is also the name of a dry forest reserve east and west of the town, the largest remaining tract of tropical dry coastal forest in the world and designated an international Biosphere Reserve in 1981. The park comprising much of the dry forest is known as Bosque Seco de Guánica.

Highway Route 116, the nearest principal road, heads west toward Lajas and east toward Ponce, passing through the island of Puerto Rico's driest area. The largely intact forest of the Guánica Dry Forest reserve hosts the greatest number of bird species found on the island, including several bird species seldom found anywhere else: the Puerto Rican lizard cuckoo, Puerto Rican woodpecker, the Puerto Rican nightjar, and the Puerto Rican emerald hummingbird. Other animals thought to be extinct in Puerto Rico have turned up in this forest. Many different types of cacti grow here, a stunning contrast to the lush Caribbean National Forest in the northeast part of the island, which is a tropical rainforest.

The forest reserve of some  contains  of trails through four different forest types: deciduous trees, a coastal region with tree-size milkweed and  prickly pear cactus, a mahogany forest, and twisted gumbo limbo trees. There are about 700 varieties of plants, including aroma (acacia) and guayacan (Lignum vitae—Latin for 'wood of life'). One guayacan is about 500–700 years old. The squat melon cactus and other cacti can be found here along with 40 species of birds, including the guabairo (Puerto Rican nightjar), found nowhere else. Also found in the area are the Puerto Rico crested toad (Peltophryne lemur) and, sometimes on the beaches, green and leatherback turtles, though their eggs suffer severe predation from mongooses one time introduced to fight rats in sugarcane fields.

Barrios

Like all municipalities of Puerto Rico, Guánica is subdivided into barrios.

Arena
Caño
Carenero
Ciénaga
Ensenada
Guánica barrio-pueblo
Montalva
Susúa Baja

Sectors
Barrios (which are like minor civil divisions) and subbarrios, in turn, are further subdivided into smaller local populated place areas/units called sectores (sectors in English). The types of sectores may vary, from normally sector to urbanización to reparto to barriada to residencial, among others.

Special Communities

 (Special Communities of Puerto Rico) are marginalized communities whose citizens are experiencing a certain amount of social exclusion. A map shows these communities occur in nearly every municipality of the commonwealth. Of the 742 places that were on the list in 2014, the following barrios, communities, sectors, or neighborhoods were in Guánica: Esperanza neighborhood, Callejón Magüeyes, El Batey, El Tumbao, Ensenada, Fuig, La Luna, and Playa Santa.

Tourism

Landmarks and places of interest
Guánica has 39 beaches, including .

 Guánica Parador 1929 is a historic inn near the sugar mill
Museum of Art and History of Guánica (former town hall)
Azul Beach
 Ballenas Bay
 Ballenas Beach (is considered a dangerous beach)
Caprón Fortress
Casa Alejada
Cayo Aurora (popularly known as Gilligan's Island)
Copamarina Beach Resort
El Malecón (Boardwalk)
Guánica Bay
Playa Manglillo is a beach near Playa Santa.
Playa Santa Beach
Punta de Brea, a surf spot
Punta Jorobao
Hacienda Santa Rita
Serra Beach
Central Guánica (Sugar Cane Refinery)
 Guánica State Forest, also called Guánica Dry Forest is a 9,000-acre forest
Mimi's Guest House, a small guest in the Guánica State Forest
Mary Lee's By the Sea
Guánica Lighthouse ruins

Economy

Agriculture
Salt and Sugarcane

Industry
Manufacture (apparel)

Culture

Festivals and events
Guánica celebrates its patron saint festival in July. The  is a religious and cultural celebration that generally features parades, games, artisans, amusement rides, regional food, and live entertainment.

Other festivals and events celebrated in Guánica include:
Fish Festival – April
July 25 Parade – July
Juan Ponce de León Celebration – August

Demographics

Government

Like all municipalities in Puerto Rico, Guánica is administered by a mayor. The current mayor is Ismael (Titi) Rodríguez Ramos, from the Popular Democratic Party (PPD). Rodríguez was elected in the 2020 general election after a close race with Santos Seda (Papichy) from the New Progressive Party (PNP). While both candidates received almost the same share of the vote, 2,000 ballots where write in votes mostly for Edgardo Cruz Vélez an independent candidate. This resulted in a vote recount and while the initial results signaled Vélez was the victor, after weeks of counting, Rodríguez was declared the winner. Vélez initially conceded the race but then petitioned a court to adjudge early voting ballots to his count. This court case and subsequent court appeal where both dismissed.

The city belongs to the Puerto Rico Senatorial district V, which is represented by two senators. In 2012, Ramón Ruiz and Martín Vargas Morales, from the Popular Democratic Party (PPD), were elected as District Senators. In 2020, Marially Gozález and Ramón Ruiz, from the Popular Democratic Party (PPD), were elected as District Senators.

Symbols
The  has an official flag and coat of arms.

Flag
The five waves, blue and yellow represent the Guánica Bay, a fragment of the Official Shield of Guánica.

Coat of arms
Shield divided in four quarters. In the superior right side, it has a "bohío" (a native hut) under a crown that represents Cacique Agüeybaná, whose yucayeque (Indian territory) was in this region. In the superior left quarter, a lion representing Juan Ponce de León. The red and yellow checkered strips over a silver-plated background in the inferior right side represent the shields of Don Cristóbal de Sotomayor, founder of the town of Tavara, the actual location of Guánica. The waved stripes represent the bay of this town. The branches surrounding the shield represent the sugarcane industry that was very important in this region.

Notable "Guaniqueños"
Agüeybaná and Agüeybaná II, Taíno chiefs
 Rose Franco (b. 1932), first Puerto Rican woman Chief Warrant Officer in U.S. Marine Corps
 Primitivo Anglada – Activist in obtaining Guánica's municipal independence. First secretary of the town council.
 Miguel A. Morciglio – Member of the House of Representatives for District 24 (1961–64).
 Carmen Ramírez Vargas (Lolita Vargas) – Singer, actress, and educator.
 Rubén del Rosario – Educator, writer, and linguist.
 Víctor Sallaberry – First mayor elected by the people, in 1914.
 Pedro Santana Ronda – Writer, poet, and journalist. Was published in the weekly paper El Erizo.
 Domingo Suárez Cruz – Civic leader, political orator, and writer. Was keeper of the Guánica Lighthouse. The public library was named in his honor.
 María Heliodora Vargas – Educator and author of the poem «La bandera de los guaniqueños» ('The Flag of the Guaniqueños').
 Pedro Juan Vargas Mercado – Journalist and historian.
 Pedro Vargas Rodríguez – Secretary of the Separation Committee that achieved the emancipation of the municipality. Poet, orator, musician, writer, and journalist. Founded El Fósforo (1908) and Brisas del Caribe (1915), the first newspapers in Guánica.

Transportation
At one time during 1937, Guánica received domestic, commercial airline flights from San Juan on Puerto Rico's national airline, Puertorriqueña de Aviación.

There are 25 bridges in Guánica.

Gallery

Books
Torres, Angel Luis, Walter Torres, and Miguel Canals. En el Bosque Seco de Guánica. San Juan, Puerto Rico: La Editorial Universidad de Puerto Rico (Colección San Pedrito), 1995.  – Children's picture book about a trip through the dry forest of Guánica with a sea turtle. 
La Muerte de un Gigante: historia de la central guanica, autora Aria E. Ramos, La Muerte de Un Gigante: Historia de la Central Guanica y el poblado de Ensenada: Maria E. Ramos: 9781563281471: Amazon.com: Books

See also

List of Puerto Ricans
History of Puerto Rico
National Register of Historic Places listings in Guánica, Puerto Rico
Did you know-Puerto Rico?

References

Further reading

External links 

Visit the Guanica dry forest

Gilligan's Island Photos and information, Guanica, Puerto Rico
Bosque Seco de Guánica 
El Bosque Estatal de Guánica 
Mapa del Bosque Seco

 
Municipalities of Puerto Rico
Populated coastal places in Puerto Rico
Populated places established in 1508
1511 disestablishments
Yauco metropolitan area
1508 establishments in the Spanish Empire